Amy Lynn Vachal (born December 8, 1988) is an American singer-songwriter. She is best known as a semi-finalist on the 9th season of The Voice, where she chose Pharrell Williams as her coach and was later "stolen" by Adam Levine. She had previously released two EPs prior to appearing on The Voice.

Biography
Amy Lynn Vachal was born on December 8, 1988 to an American father, Richard Vachal, and a Filipina mother, Deirdra Vachal, who is a daughter of Filipino politician, former congressman, and Governor of Cebu, Pablo P. Garcia and Judge Esperanza Fiel-Garcia. She has one older brother, Jake Vachal. Growing up, Vachal's love for singing developed into a "secret passion". She graduated from the Rutgers Preparatory School before she pursued a dual degree in economics and studio art at Swarthmore College in Pennsylvania and played both varsity soccer and lacrosse.

After a traumatic head injury from playing lacrosse, Vachal turned to music as she recovered. She started writing songs and performed her first set in New York City at the age of 20 at Arlene's Grocery in the lower east side. After finishing college, she sold a few of her paintings to move to New York and started performing in small clubs and cafes such as Rockwood Music Hall, The Living Room, and Caffe Vivaldi. While living in New York, she had several jobs as a voice-over artist, waitress, secretary, barista, and also worked in a bakery and a bar.

Career

Early career
Vachal's first EP, Appleseed, was released in 2011. She also released a single in 2013, "Catapult". After she was awarded positions in artist-in-residency programs at The Motley Fool in Alexandria, VA and Madrono Ranch in Medina, Texas as a songwriter, she returned to New York City and recorded her second EP entitled Crinkle Bloom, released in 2014, with Ken Rockwood of Rockwood Recordings. Her second EP's songs were written during her first two years in New York. She had also written one song in Medina. She took on more voice-over work for commercial demos, eventually landing a national campaign as the singer for a Kellogg's commercial in 2014.

2015: The Voice
Vachal auditioned for the ninth season of The Voice, singing "Dream a Little Dream of Me" for her blind audition. Except for Adam Levine whose team was full, the three other coaches, Gwen Stefani, Pharrell Williams, and Blake Shelton, turned their chairs for her, and she eventually chose Williams as her coach. She advanced to the Knockout rounds, where she was not chosen to advance by Williams. However, Levine and Shelton then opted to steal her, with Vachal choosing Levine as her new coach. Vachal's performances charted consistently, including her version of Drake's Hotline Bling charting at No. 28 on Billboard's Digital Songs chart. A week later, her rendition of Taylor Swift's Blank Space charted at No. 24. She was eliminated in the semi-finals.

Chart of The Voice performances 
 Studio version of performance reached the top 10 on iTunes

Career after The Voice 
After her elimination from The Voice, Vachal stated that she would be working on her first full-length album soon. She resides in Brooklyn, New York when not on tour as she workshops new material for a prospective release. On March 3, 2017, she released the single "Wait" and on March 28, she appeared on The Tonight Show Starring Jimmy Fallon in the segment 'Battle of the Instant Songwriters'.

Discography

Singles

References

External links
 

1988 births
Living people
Singers from Pennsylvania
Swarthmore College alumni
The Voice (franchise) contestants
21st-century American singers
Participants in American reality television series
21st-century American women singers